{{Infobox television
| image                = Celebrity Name Game Title Card.jpg
| image_alt            =
| caption              = 
| genre                = Game show
| based_on             = {{based on|Celebrity Name Game}}
| developer            = 
| writer               = Henry Stone
| screenplay           = 
| story                = 
| director             = Peter Ots
| creative_director    = Jennifer Collins
| presenter            = Grant Denyer
| theme_music_composer = Tim Mosher & Stoker
| opentheme            = 
| endtheme             = 
| composer             = 
| country              = Australia
| language             = English
| num_seasons          = 1
| num_episodes         = 144 
| list_episodes        = List of Celebrity Name Game Australia episodes
| executive_producer   = 
| producer             = 
| location             = Sydney, New South Wales
| camera               = Multi-camera
| runtime              = 30 minutes
| company              = FremantleMedia Australia
| distributor          = CBS Television Distribution
| network              = 
| picture_format       = 
| audio_format         = Stereo
| first_aired          = 
| last_aired           =  
}}Celebrity Name Game was an Australian game show based on the American show of the same name and the board game Identity Crisis (created by Laura Robinson and Richard Gerrits) hosted by Grant Denyer and first premiered on Network 10 on 13 May 2019.

Gameplay
Main game
The game involves two teams, each consisting of two contestants who are related or know each other. They are joined by two guest celebrities who assist the teams for all but the third segment of the show, attempting to identify the names of popular culture subjects like celebrities, fictional characters, place names, or film and television titles.

In the first two rounds, each team is assigned one of the celebrities, who then will switch teams for the second round. Each of the three-member teams are presented with a category containing ten names. One person will give clues, trying to get the other two to guess the names. Successful guesses earn money. An illegal clue (saying the name or part of the name, spelling the name, or rhyming the name) voids that name. Each turn lasts for 45 seconds. In the first round, one team is chosen to play first, and chooses one of two categories presented, leaving the second team to play the remaining category. In the second round, the second team plays first and chooses the first category.

In round one, the celebrity gives the clues while turning back and forth to alternately face each contestant, and each correct answer is worth $100, up to $1,000 total. In round two, one of the two contestants gives clues while alternately facing either the remaining partner or the assigned celebrity, and each answer is worth $200, up to $2,000 total.

In the third round, the contestants go head to head while Denyer gives the clues to names under a specific category. The contestants buzz in to make a guess. If neither contestant buzzes in after a while, Denyer can start giving out clues that are normally illegal, all the way up to simply saying the name. A right answer earns money for the team that answered, but a wrong answer grants the money to the opponent. The first answer is worth $100 and each successive answer increases in value by $100. Winnings in this round are added to the money accumulated in the first two rounds, and whichever team reaches $3,000 or more first is the winner, keeps the cash, and goes on to the bonus round to play for the prize of $10,000. If no team reaches $3,000 before time is called, the team in the lead at the end of the round wins the game. If the game ends in a tie, one final name is given; a team who buzzes in with a correct answer wins the game, but a wrong answer results in an automatic loss.

Bonus round
In the bonus round, there is no particular category. The names of people, characters, places, shows or things are hidden behind ten numbered squares. The contestants take turns giving the clues to both celebrities. One contestant is placed in a soundproof booth while the other gives clues. The current giver starts describing when a name or picture is exposed. If the celebrity receivers get it right, the name stays revealed. Passing on a name re-conceals it. This round lasts for a total of 75 seconds, the first contestant has 45 seconds, and the second has 30 seconds. If the first clue giver provides an illegal clue to a name, that name is replaced by a different one for the second clue giver. Any illegal clue by the second clue giver, however, ends the round immediately. Getting all ten increases the team's total winnings to $10,000. If the first contestant correctly guesses all ten names within 45 seconds or less, the second portion of the round is not played. Otherwise, the team takes home only the amount they had earned by the end of Round 3.

Production and broadcastCelebrity Name Game'' aired in a 6:00 pm timeslot and was broadcast five nights a week from Mondays to Fridays, with repeats aired at 8:00 am the following morning (Friday shows airing on Monday mornings).
The show was filmed at Network 10's studios in Pyrmont, Sydney.

Merchandise
A board game featuring Denyer on the cover was released by Imagination Gaming in 2019.

Series overview

Cast

Hosts
 Grant Denyer
 Rove McManus (10 episodes)

Celebrities

 Tommy Little
 Lisa Wilkinson
 Beau Ryan
 Sam Simmons
 Yvie Jones
 Angie Kent
 Lawrence Leung
 Scott Tweedie
 Sharna Burgess
 Tristan MacManus
 Courtney Act
 Tahir Bilgiç
 Susie Youssef
 Jane Hall
 Ed Kavalee
 Ash London
 Olympia Valance
 Merrick Watts
 Peter Rowsthorn
 Matty Johnson
 Tom Ballard
 Lucy Durack
 Gina Liano
 Brendan Jones
 Casey Donovan
 Denise Drysdale
 Jessica Rowe
 Johnny Ruffo
 Rhonda Burchmore
 Jay Pharoah
 Sarah Harris
 Angela Bishop
 Annie Maynard
 Stephanie Rice
 The Umbilical Brothers
 Tim Blackwell
 Michelle Bridges
 Nazeem Hussain
 Nikki Osborne
 Paul Fenech
 Harley Breen
 Cal Wilson
 Natarsha Belling
 Merv Hughes
 Amos Gill
 Alan Fletcher
 Ryan Moloney
 Hans
 Dave Thornton
 Nath Valvo
 Lisa Curry
 Steve Willis
 Gyton Grantley
 Tanya Hennessy
 Gary Mehigan
 Matt Sinclair
 Julie Goodwin
 Damian Walshe-Howling
 Ivan Aristeguieta
 George Calombaris
 Anna Polyviou
 Rove McManus
 Peter Helliar
 Georgie Carroll
 Melody Thornton
 Justin Lacko
 Natalie Bassingthwaighte
 Will McMahon
 Woody Whitelaw
 John Edward
 Osher Günsberg
 Dave O'Neil
 Joe Hildebrand
 Anthony Callea
 James Mathison
 Vicky Pattison
 Shannon Noll
 Bernard Curry
 Ebony Vagulans
 Tim Campbell
 Veronica Milsom
 Lewis Hobba
 Celia Pacquola
 Steven Bradbury
 Georgia Love
 Lee Elliot
 Dylan Lewis
 Kent Small
 Ash Pollard
 Steen Raskopoulos
 Matt Farrelly
 Janine Allis
 Andrew Ettingshausen
 Bonnie Lythgoe
 Alex Jae
 Alex Lee
 Ian "Dicko" Dickson
 Mel Buttle
 Bonnie Anderson
 Matt Burke
 David Campese
 Jimeoin
 Liz Ellis
 Catherine Cox
 Erika Heynatz
 Nicola Parry
 Heidi Arena
 Roxy Jacenko
 Wippa
 Richard Reid
 Stacey Thomson
 John Foreman
 Christie Whelan Browne
 Jett Kenny
 Dave Hughes
 Charlie Pickering
 Dannii Minogue
 Luke McGregor
 Chris Brown
 Gretel Killeen
 Kate McCartney
 Kate McLennan
 Rob Mills
 Melissa Tkautz
 Anthony "Harries" Carrol
 Bruce "Hoppo" Hopkins
 Patrick Abboud
 Lehmo
 Nikki Britton
 Scott McLaughlin
 David Reynolds

References

External links

Production website

Network 10 original programming
2019 Australian television series debuts
2010s Australian game shows
2020 Australian television series endings
English-language television shows
Television shows set in Sydney
Television series by Fremantle (company)
Australian television series based on American television series